Edward McMath Beers (May 27, 1877 – April 21, 1932) was a Republican member of the U.S. House of Representatives from Pennsylvania.

Edward M. Beers was born in Nossville, Tell Township, Huntingdon County, Pennsylvania on May 27, 1877. In 1895, he moved with his parents to Mount Union, Pennsylvania when they purchased the then Seibert House. He graduated from Mount Union High School in 1895.  Upon the death of his father in 1895, he took over the family hotel business, serving as the proprietor of the Beers Hotel, located at the corner of Shirley and Jefferson Streets in Mount Union.   He was also interested in agricultural pursuits. He was a delegate to the Republican State Convention at Harrisburg, Pennsylvania in 1898. He served as mayor of Mount Union from 1910 to 1914. He was a member of the board of directors of the First National Bank of Mount Union and of the Grange Trust Co. of Huntingdon, Pennsylvania. He was an associate judge of Huntingdon County, Pennsylvania from 1914 to 1923. Beers was elected as a Republican to the Sixty-eighth and to the four succeeding Congresses and served until his death in Washington, D.C.  Interment in the Odd Fellows’ Cemetery in Mount Union.

See also
 List of United States Congress members who died in office (1900–1949)

Sources

The Political Graveyard
Welch, Charles Howard M.E., A.B. History of Mount Union, Shirleysburg and Shirley Township Printed at the Mount Union Times Office 1909-1910 reprinted by the Mount Union Area Historical Society 1998

1877 births
1932 deaths
Republican Party members of the United States House of Representatives from Pennsylvania
Mayors of places in Pennsylvania